Protease A may refer to one of two enzymes:
Streptogrisin A
Omptin